Season 1999–2000 was the 116th football season in which Dumbarton competed at a Scottish national level, entering the Scottish Football League for the 94th time, the Scottish Cup for the 105th time, the Scottish League Cup for the 53rd time and the Scottish Challenge Cup for the ninth time.

Overview 
Season 1999-2000 would be one of the most memorable for Dumbarton, but not because of any titles won or lost, but because this would be the last season that the club would play at their famous Boghead Park.  Dumbarton's home had been here for the past 121 years - the longest that any British football club had stayed at any home ground.  Now the ground had been sold and Dumbarton would move to a new purpose built stadium at the foot of Dumbarton Rock.

The season itself was unremarkable.  Three promotion places were up for grabs due to the addition of Elgin City and Peterhead the following season, however despite an encouraging start there was never a real chance of a top three finish and in the end a midtable 6th place was achieved. It would be the final game however that would define the whole campaign.  As it was a crowd in excess of 3,000 turned out to bid farewell to the old ground and with it a fine victory over promoted East Fife.

In the national cup competitions, there was little to cheer. In the Scottish Cup, Dumbarton lost to Stenhousemuir in the second round.

In the League Cup, after a win over Brechin City, Dundee would easily dispatch Dumbarton in the second round.

With newfound sponsorship, the Scottish Challenge Cup was re-instated, but the same old failures beset Dumbarton - yet another first round defeat, this time to Airdrie.

Locally, in the Stirlingshire Cup, Dumbarton lost their two group ties.

Results & fixtures

Scottish Third Division

Bell's Challenge Cup

CIS League Cup

Tennent's Scottish Cup

Stirlingshire Cup

Friendlies

League table

Player statistics

Squad 

|}

Transfers

Players in

Players out

Youth Team
Dumbarton played an under 19 team in the Scottish Youth Division B, and with 6 wins and 4 draws from 26 games, finished 9th of 10.

Trivia
 The League match against Albion Rovers on 8 August marked Kenny Meechan's 100th appearance for Dumbarton in all national competitions - the 114th Dumbarton player to reach this milestone.

See also
 1999–2000 in Scottish football

References

External links
Derek Barnes (Dumbarton Football Club Historical Archive)
Paul Finnegan (Dumbarton Football Club Historical Archive)
Alan Brown (Dumbarton Football Club Historical Archive)
Hrienn Hringsson (Dumbarton Football Club Historical Archive)
Chris Smith (Dumbarton Football Club Historical Archive)
Scottish Football Historical Archive

Dumbarton F.C. seasons
Scottish football clubs 1999–2000 season